David Brooks (born 1975) is an artist based in New York City. He won the Rome Prize in 2019. He was featured in the Art21 series on PBS.

Work 
Brooks' work explores the interaction between humans and their natural and synthetic environments. His past projects include a dissembled combine harvester at the Aldrich Contemporary Art Museum and a buried tractor at the Storm King Art Center. He created Desert Rooftops, as part of an Art Production Fund commission in the Last Lot in Times Square.

References

External links

1975 births
Living people
American artists